Grarem is a municipality in Mila Province, Algeria. Grarem Gouga is the administrative center. At the 2008 census it had a population of 28,552.

It took its name from two different entities. In fact, Grarem comes from the word guroum which means rock or pebble while Gouga is the name of a native hero of the war of independence. It was named after him after the independence.

References

Populated places in Mila Province